Mera Dil, Mera Dushman is a Pakistani television series premiered on 3 February 2020 on ARY Digital. It is directed by Syed Ali Raza Usama and co-produced by Humayun Saeed and Samina Humayun Saeed under Six Sigma Plus and Next Level Entertainment. It has Alizeh Shah, Noaman Sami, Yasir Nawaz, and Anam Tanveer in pivotal roles.

The show was on break from 18 May 2020 to 10 June 2020 due to the cast of the show contracting coronavirus and resumed from 11 June 2020.

Plot
Mera Dil Mera Dushman is a story of a young innocent girl Mairah, (Alizeh Shah) who marries a much older man Zafar (Yasir Nawaz) for the exchange of money. Unfortunately, she comes face to face with the bitter reality that her one and only love Shameer (Noman Sami) is now her son-in-law.

Cast 
 Alizeh Shah as Mairah Zafar 
 Yasir Nawaz as Zafar
 Noaman Sami as Shameer
 Laiba Khan as Ayesha Shahmeer
 Anam Tanveer as Shaheena Jawad 
 Naveed Raza as Jawad; Mairah's brother
 Gul e Rana as Mairah's mother
 Aamna Malick as Aiman Ali, Zafar’s elder brother's daughter 
 Shazia Gohar as Parveen 
 Fatima Sohail as Rabiya
 Salman Saeed as Ali
 Akbar Islam as Khalid 
 Fareeda Shabbir as Shagufta Zafar
 Asiya Irshad
 Saba Shah
 Malik Raza as Kamal

Reception

Awards and nominations

References

External links 
Official website

Pakistani drama television series
2020 Pakistani television series debuts
Pakistani television series
ARY Digital original programming
2020s Pakistani television series
Urdu-language television shows
2020 Pakistani television series endings